The Sauer S 2500 UL and Sauer S 2500 ULT are four-stroke aircraft engines for homebuilt aircraft

Design and development
The engines are based on the Wasserboxer. They are extensively modified for aircraft use and all the parts are custom made. These engines are derived from the certified engines produced by the same manufacturer and used in several motorgliders and light aircraft.

Variants
Sauer S 2500 UL
Sauer S 2500 ULT

Applications
Homebuilt aircraft

Specifications (variant)

See also
Sauer engines

References

External links

S2500